Compagnie Électro-Mécanique (CEM) was a French electrical engineering manufacturer based in Paris, Le Havre, Lyon, Le Bourget, Nancy, Dijon. It was a subsidiary company of Brown, Boveri & Cie.

Production
The company produced DC motors, AC motors, generators, turbines, transformers and railway locomotives. Examples of railway locomotives included SNCF Class C 61000 and SNCF Class CC 65500.

Acquisition by Alsthom
It was acquired by Alsthom in 1983.

References

Alstom